is a Japanese surname indicating relation to the Imperial House.

People 

, Japanese illustrator and comic artist
 Kaoru Sumeragi, Japanese anime director

Fictional characters 

, a character from Agent Aika
, a character from Beyblade
 Hotsuma Sumeragi, a character from Niraikanai: Harukanaru Neno Kuni
, a character from Kakegurui – Compulsive Gambler
, a character from Code Geass
 Rinko and Sen Sumeragi, characters from Dash! Yonkuro
, from the manga Tokyo Babylon, X/1999 and Tsubasa: Reservoir Chronicle
, twin sister of Subaru, from the manga Tokyo Babylon and X/1999
, a character from Mobile Suit Gundam 00
, characters from Steel Angel Kurumi 2
, a character from Yami to Bōshi to Hon no Tabibito
, a character from Uta no Prince-sama
, a character from B-Daman
, a character from Inazuma Eleven
, a character from Blood Blockade Battlefront
Reisys VI Felicity Sumeragi, a character Self-proclaimed from Boku wa Tomodachi ga Sukunai
, a character from Scarlet Nexus
Sumeragi, a character from Fire Emblem Fates
Satsuki Sumeragi, a character from Seirei Gensouki: Spirit Chronicles

Japanese-language surnames